Darreh Yas (also Romanized as Darreh Yās; also known as Rūd Vār and Rūdwār) is a village in Mashayekh Rural District, Naghan District, Kiar County, Chaharmahal and Bakhtiari Province, Iran. At the 2006 census, its population was 329, in 76 families.

References 

Populated places in Kiar County